Kainar may refer to:

 14056 Kainar, an asteroid
 Kainar, Iran, a village